Three athletes represented the Philippines in the 2008 Summer Paralympics in Beijing, China. The 2-person keelboat sailing team of Pedro Sollique and Cherry Pinpin were based in the seaport city of Qingdao while Adeline Dumapong was in Beijing for the powerlifting event. The Philippine Paralympic delegation was headed by PhilSPADA-NPC, with support from the Philippine Sports Commission and the Philippine Olympic Committee.

Powerlifting

Women

Sailing

The Philippines first Paralympic Sailing Team competed on the 2-person keelboat (SKUD 18), which also made its official debut in the Paralympics. The only Paralympic class keelboat with a spinnaker, was, for this event, emblazoned with the national flag of each country. Pedro Sollique, paraw fisherman from Virac, Catanduanes was SKUD helm while crew Cherry Pinpin, a creative director from Quezon City trimmed sails and flew the spinnaker. The Philippine flag spinnaker was a generous, timely donation by an anonymous Australian businessman. 

The Sailing competition of the Beijing 2008 Paralympic Games took place on the Yellow Sea, Qingdao, from September 8 to September 13. The Qingdao International Sailing Centre served as measuring and decal application area, boat workspace, dock, public viewing areas and awards area. Qingdao, in eastern Shandong province, a seaside sailing city famous for its Tsingtao Beer, seafood and white sand beaches, is an hour's flight SE of Beijing. The rest of the Qingdao-based team was composed of Philippine Sailing Association National Coach Rico Albeso plus PHI Sailing team manager and Sailability Philippines President, Claudio Altura. 

The sailors had qualified the Philippines for the Summer Paralympics during the IFDS Two-Person Keelboat World Championship held March 2008, in Singapore. The SKUD 18 has already been approved for competition in the  London 2012 Paralympics.

Note: CAN - Race cancelled • Races Sailed: 10 • Score Discards: 2 • Races counted: 8

See also
2008 Summer Paralympics
Sailing at the 2008 Summer Paralympics
Philippines at the 2008 Summer Olympics
SKUD 18
Sport in the Philippines

References

External links
Qingdao 2008 Paralympic Games (Sailing Official Site)
IFDS Paralympic Sailing Competition (Official Site)
Beijing 2008 Paralympic Games (Official Site)
International Paralympic Committee
International Access Class Org - SKUD 18
Sailability World

Nations at the 2008 Summer Paralympics
2008
Paralympics